The 1995–96 Marquette Golden Eagles men's basketball team represented the Marquette University in the 1995–96 season. The Golden Eagles finished the regular season with a record of 23–8. As a 4 seed, the Golden Eagles defeated the 13 seed Monmouth in the first round, 68–44. Marquette would fall to Arkansas in the second round.

Roster

Schedule

|-
!colspan=9 style=| Conference USA tournament

|-
!colspan=9 style=| NCAA tournament

Team players drafted into the NBA

External links
MUScoop's MUWiki

References 

Marquette
Marquette Golden Eagles men's basketball seasons
Marquette
Marq
Marq